The blackish skate (Rajella nigerrima) is a species of fish in the family Rajidae. It is found in Chile, Ecuador, and Peru. Its natural habitat is open seas.

References

Rajella
Taxonomy articles created by Polbot
Fish described in 1960